U.S. Highway 93 (US 93) is a north–south United States Numbered Highway in the state of Montana.

Route description

US 93 enters Montana from Idaho at Lost Trail Pass and travels north descending through the Bitterroot National Forest. The highway continues along the Lewis and Clark Trail into the Bitterroot Valley toward Missoula, passing through Darby and Hamilton.

From Wye, US 93 continues north through the Flathead Indian Reservation, where its signage includes the historic Salish and Kutenai names for towns, rivers, and streams. Portions of this section run along the Bison Range. North of the reservation, US 93 traverses the western shore of Flathead Lake, the largest freshwater lake west of the Mississippi River. North of the lake the highway runs through the cities of Kalispell and Whitefish, traveling through the Flathead National Forest and the Stillwater State Forest before reaching its terminus at the Canadian border near Eureka.

The portion north of Hamilton travels through one of the most densely populated areas in Montana. This section also serves as a popular north–south connection between Yellowstone National Park and Glacier National Park. As a result, the road tends to become more congested between Hamilton and Whitefish. A popular bumper sticker in Montana reads, "Pray for me, I drive Hwy 93!"

History
The Lewis and Clark Expedition became the first white men to travel the future US 93 corridor between today's Lost Trail Pass and Lolo in 1805, and Lewis's detachment ventured further north to the future site of Missoula in 1806 on their way to explore the Marias River. When US 93 was established in 1926, the nature of the highway's construction in Montana's mixture of terrain around glacial lakes, through dense forests and over high mountains was a significant challenge given the construction techniques and equipment of the time. On completed sections, animal-vehicle accidents would prove to be a thorn in the side of traveler and engineer alike.

Many stretches have been widened and straightened, or else rerouted in ongoing efforts to improve traffic safety and preserve animals at the same time. Some of the old sections are still in use today, including the original gravel routing from Lost Trail Pass to Sula vía Gibbons Pass and Bitterroot-Bighorn Roads, and old paved sections from Darby to Hamilton, through Missoula via Brooks, Stephens, Orange and West Broadway Streets, through St. Ignatius, north of Ronan to north of Pablo, northeast of Elmo through Dayton, Political Hill Road south of Lakeside, Lakeside Boulevard north of Lakeside, Old US 93 S in Somers, Forest Hill Road north of Somers, and two sections between Whitefish and Eureka.

US 93 is now four-lanes from Hamilton to Evaro, through Arlee, north of Ronan to the south edge of Polson, and north of Somers to the south edge of Whitefish (except a six-block section near the county courthouse in Kalispell).

Significant animal conservation efforts have also been accomplished in several areas of the corridor from Hamilton to Missoula, and from Missoula to Polson. In 1997, the Confederated Salish and Kootenai Tribes of the Flathead Nation entered negotiations with the Montana Department of Transportation over improvements to the  through the reservation as the tribes were concerned that project would destroy wetlands, further fragment wildlife habitat, and kill more animals crossing the highway. With concern for the nearby designated wilderness and grizzly bear habitat in the Mission Mountains, an agreement with the state and the Federal Highway Administration was reached in December 2000.

Kalispell Bypass
A new US 93 Alternate (US 93 Alt.) was built to bypass through traffic around downtown Kalispell, Montana, between 2010-2016. Currently, US 93 through Kalispell is Main Street and Sunset Boulevard, a  arterial. The remaining  opened on October 28, 2016. The southwest  segment of the bypass is currently only two lanes and is slated for expansion to four lanes with two additional grade-separated interchanges when funding permits.

Major intersections

References

External links

 The People's Way post-construction monitoring from MDT
Travelers' Rest State Park Travelers' Rest Preservation and Heritage Association
Travelers' Rest State Park Montana Fish, Game, & Parks
Travelers' Rest State Park AllTrips: Missoula, Montana
Lewis and Clark Trail site
Old Map of Travelers' Rest area

 Montana
93
Transportation in Ravalli County, Montana
Transportation in Missoula County, Montana
Transportation in Lake County, Montana
Transportation in Flathead County, Montana
Transportation in Lincoln County, Montana
Missoula, Montana